Bungay is a market town, civil parish and electoral ward in the English county of Suffolk.

History 

The origin of the name of Bungay is thought to derive from the Anglo-Saxon title Bunincga-haye, signifying the land belonging to the tribe of Bonna, a Saxon chieftain. Due to its high position, protected by the River Waveney and marshes, the site was in a good defensive position and attracted settlers from early times. Roman artefacts have been found in the region.

Bungay Castle, which is shown on Bungay's town sign,  was built by the Normans but was later rebuilt by Roger Bigod, 5th Earl of Norfolk and his family, who also owned Framlingham Castle. The castle contains a unique surviving example of mining galleries, dating to the siege of the castle in 1174. They were intended to undermine and thus collapse the castle's tower and keep.

The Church of St. Mary was once the church of the Benedictine Bungay Priory, founded by Gundreda, wife of Roger de Glanville. The 13th-century Franciscan friar Thomas Bungay later enjoyed a popular reputation as a magician, appearing as Roger Bacon's sidekick in Robert Greene's Elizabethan comedy Frier Bacon and Frier Bongay.

The 11th century church of Holy Trinity, with its round tower, lies SE of St. Mary's churchyard, while the 19th century red brick Roman Catholic church of St. Edmund is immediately S of the churchyard.

The town was almost destroyed by a great fire in 1688. The central Buttercross was constructed in 1689 and was the place where local farmers displayed their butter and other farm produce for sale. Until 1810, there was also a Corn Cross, but this was taken down and replaced by a pump.

Bungay was important for the printing and paper manufacture industries. Joseph Hooper, a wealthy Harvard University graduate who fled Massachusetts when his lands were seized after the American Revolution, rented a mill at Bungay in 1783 and converted it to paper manufacture. Charles Brightly established a printing and stereotype foundry in 1795. Then in partnership with John Filby Childs, the business became Brightly & Childs in 1808 and later Messrs. Childs and Son. Charles Childs (1807–1876) succeeded his father as the head of the firm of John Childs & Son. The business was further expanded after 1876 as R. Clay and Sons, Ltd.

The railway arrived with the Harleston to Bungay section of the Waveney Valley Line opening in November 1860 and the Bungay to Beccles section in March 1863. Bungay had its own railway station near Clay's Printers. The station closed to passengers in 1953 and freight in 1964.

Modern Bungay 

Local firms include St. Peter's Brewery, based at St. Peter's Hall to the south of the town.

In 2008, Bungay became Suffolk's first Transition Town and part of a global network of communities that have started projects in the areas of food, transport, energy, education, housing and waste as small-scale local responses to the global challenges of climate change, economic hardship and limited of cheap energy.

Reeve 
Bungay is the only town in the UK to still have a town reeve, though there are surviving portreeves in Laugharne and Ashburton. The reeve runs the town trust, from which each reeve selects the following reeve, and serves as the town's figurehead.

Black Shuck 

St Mary's Church was struck by lightning on Sunday, 4 August 1577. According to legend, an apparition appeared during the thunderstorm, consisting of a black Hell Hound which dashed around the church, attacking members of the congregation. The dog has been associated with Black Shuck, a dog haunting the coasts of Norfolk, Essex, and Suffolk.

An image of the Black Dog has been incorporated in the coat of arms of Bungay and has been used in the titles of various enterprises associated with Bungay as well as several of the town's sporting events. An annual race, The Black Dog Marathon, begins in Bungay, and follows the course of the River Waveney and the town's football club is nicknamed the "Black Dogs". Black Shuck was also the subject of a song by The Darkness.

Sport

The local football club, Bungay Town F.C., play in the Anglian Combination, having previously been members of the Eastern Counties League.

Godric Cycling Club is based in Bungay. It organises a number of events each year, including weekly club runs.

Darts professional Andrew Gilding lives in Bungay. Gilding won the PDC's UK Open tournament in 2023, defeating Michael van Gerwen 11-10 in the final at Butlin's Minehead Resort.

Notable residents 

Bungay was home to several literary figures. Thomas Miller (1731–1804), the bookseller and antiquarian, settled in the village. His publisher son, William Miller (1769–1844), was born there. The author Elizabeth Bonhôte, née Mapes, (1744–1818) was born and grew up there, marrying Daniel Bonhôte and writing the notable book Bungay Castle, a gothic romance. Bonhôte even once owned Bungay Castle. The Strickland family which, according to the Canadian Dictionary of Biography, was as prolific as the Brontës, Edgeworths and Trollopes, settled in the village 1802–08. Its daughters included Agnes, a historian.

The noted French writer, politician, diplomat and historian, François-René, vicomte de Chateaubriand while exiled from France, 1792 – 1800, during the Revolution spent a period living at the Music House, No. 34 Bridge Street. This is recorded on a blue plaque.

Others were Catharine Parr Traill, who concentrated on children's literature, and Susanna Moodie, who emigrated to Canada and wrote Roughing it in the Bush (1852) as a warning to others. The novelist Sir H. Rider Haggard (1856–1925) was born nearby in Bradenham and presented St. Mary's Church with a wooden panel, displayed behind the altar. Religious writer Margaret Barber (1869–1901), author of the posthumously published best-selling book of meditations, The Roadmender, settled in Bungay.

More recently, Formula 1 motor racing president Bernie Ecclestone was brought up in Bungay and internet activist Julian Assange was confined to nearby Ellingham Hall, Norfolk in 2010–11. Authors Elizabeth Jane Howard and Louis de Bernières have lived in the town. Blind artist Sargy Mann moved to Bungay in 1990 and lived there until the end of his life. Children's author and illustrator James Mayhew currently lives in Bungay.

Darts star Andrew Gilding, the 2023 UK Open champion, lives in Bungay.

Arms

See also 

 Bungay High School
 RAF Bungay

References

External links 

 

 
Towns in Suffolk
Market towns in Suffolk
Civil parishes in Suffolk